Diospyros mindanaensis is a tree in the family Ebenaceae. Inflorescences bear up to three flowers. The tree is named for the Philippines island of Mindanao. D. mindanaensis is found in Borneo and the Philippines.

References

mindanaensis
Plants described in 1909
Trees of Borneo
Trees of the Philippines